Claudio Ridolfi (1560–1644), also known as Claudio Veronese, was an Italian painter of the Renaissance period.

Biography 
Ridolfi was born in Verona to a noble family. He was active mainly in Rome and Urbino where he was a pupil of the painters Dario Pozzo and Paolo Veronese.  Simone Cantarini, Girolamo Cialdieri, Benedetto Marini, and two painters named Patanazzi and Urbinelli were pupils or followers of Ridolfi.

Despite being unable to find employment as a painter, he lived a comfortable life and enjoyed painting. While in Urbino he married a noblewoman and established himself in Corinaldo. He died in 1644 aged 84 years old.

Works
Birth of John the Baptist for the church of Santa Lucia in Urbino
Presentation of the virgin in the temple for a church in Santo Spirito
Deposition for a church in Rimini
Santa Giustina, St Benedict presenting rules to the principal Benedictines for a church in Padua
San Fillippo and Santa Maria Assunta, in a canvas, in the church of Santa Maria Assunta, in Galzignano Terme

References

Notes

Sources

1560 births
1644 deaths
16th-century Italian painters
Italian male painters
17th-century Italian painters
Italian Renaissance painters
Painters from Verona